Annetta Johnson Saint-Gaudens (1869–1943) was an American sculptor, born in Flint, Ohio. She is best remembered for creating sculptures of "animals, children (and) fountains", but she also did the finishing carving on a "colossal marble figure", the allegorical sculpture Painting in front of the St. Louis Art Museum. She was also significant in the art world as being the wife of Louis Saint-Gaudens and the sister-in-law of Augustus Saint-Gaudens, with whom she studied and worked as an assistant.

Early years
As a young child Johnson began to draw and then model figures. Eventually her parents, realizing that their daughter had talent that needed to be developed, sent her to the Columbus Art School. She later moved to New York City, where she continued her studies at the Art Students League, studying with John Twachtman and Augustus Saint-Gaudens. In 1894, she joined the studio of Saint-Gaudens as an assistant to help with the commission for the General Logan Monument. In 1898, Annetta married Louis Saint-Gaudens, the brother of Augustus.

Her brother was the sculptor Burt Johnson.

Later life
After their marriage, Annetta and her husband relocated to Annette's hometown of Flint, Ohio. Shortly after, in 1900, Annetta gave birth to their son, Paul. In 1900, Annetta's former teacher, and now brother-in-law, again asked for her assistance in his studio. The couple relocated to Cornish, New Hampshire, where they assisted Augustus with his major sculptural commissions after Augustus was side-lined by a cancer diagnosis. Annetta and Louis set up a home and studio, relocating an old home from a near-by shaker village. Eventually, as their son Paul became interested in ceramics, the family established a pottery kiln on the property known as "Orchard Kiln."

Annetta became actively engaged in the social community of the Cornish Art Colony. She was a member of the Cornish Equal Suffrage. After the death of her husband, Annetta eventually relocated to Claremont, California. She continued to engage with the arts by teaching public school art classes.

Awards
In 1913, Johnson was awarded the McMillin Prize by the Association of Women Painters and Sculptors of New York City.  She received an honorable mention at the Panama–Pacific International Exposition in San Francisco in 1915. Twenty pieces of her work were shown in a joint exhibition with her husband at the City Art Museum of Saint Louis, in 1917.

References

External links
Louis St. Gaudens Home & Studio: National Register of Historic Places. Connecticut River Joint Commissions.

20th-century American sculptors
19th-century American sculptors
American women sculptors
Sculptors from Ohio
1869 births
1943 deaths
People from Franklin County, Ohio
Art Students League of New York alumni
20th-century American women artists
19th-century American women artists
Sculptors from New York (state)